Fraiburgo (nicknamed  Frai) is a Brazilian municipality located in the countryside of the Santa Catarina state. The city is strongly influenced by European immigrants, especially Germans and Italians. However, other nationalities also contributed to the formation of the city's character in terms of e.g.: architecture, gastronomy, religion and economy, amongst other factors. Its multiculturality is a remarkable characteristic not exclusively attributed to Fraiburgo but many other Southern Brazilian municipalities.

The city is famous in Brazil for the large production of apples which its plantation is favored by the low temperatures in the winter season in the Southern Hemisphere that takes place in July, August and September. Depending on the period of the year tourists can experience first-hand the whole apple production cycle as well other products made from apple such as: cider, juices, snacks and so forth.

Economy

In the early stages the economy of Fraiburgo's region was based on sawmills. The former dense forests consisted mostly in Brazilian walnuts, Cedars, Cinnamons, Yerba maté, and the exuberant Brazilian Pines. These forests still represent the typical Southern Brazilian landscape in spite of ruthless deforestation in the past decades. A significant turnover in the economy took place due to the shortage of wood, implementation of Brazilian environmental laws and environmental consciousness. As a result, agriculture became the predominant source of wealth alongside the production of paper, cellulose, and furniture derived from extensive reforestation areas. The reforestation projects introduced the Pinus elliottii to the region.

Agriculture
Apples are the base of Fraiburgo economy, being responsible for 60% of the total state production and 40% of the national production. The city also produces honey in large quantities; there are about 15.000 honeycombs to pollinate 7 million apple trees. Moreover, there are familiar farms that produce corn, beans, garlic, onions, and peaches.

Tourism
Rural tourism, tourism of adventure, gastronomy.

Climate

Fraiburgo has Seasoned climate: relatively hot dry summers (November to March) with temperatures reaching up to 35 degrees Celsius (95 degrees Fahrenheit) on the hottest days; winters (June to August) cold mornings, typical maximum daily temperatures of 15 degrees Celsius (59 degrees Fahrenheit), and minimums of a few degrees above freezing. The year average temperature 16,1 °C (60.8F) Occasional snowfall occurs in suburbs at higher altitudes, and may extend throughout the city, though this happens infrequently (about every 8–10 years).

Geography
Currently, its population is around 36,584 according to IBGE estimate. However, this figure fluctuates with the guest workers (10000) throughout the apple harvest season (From January to April).

Symbols

Flag

The municipal flag was instituted by Law nº 303 of 05/09/1977. It was designed by the educators Rui Batagelo and Francisco Costella supported by the professor and vexillologist Antônio Peixoto de Faria. The flag has the colors green, white and yellow. In the center there is the coat of the arms of Fraiburgo (2nd version), representing the municipal government. The green color represents the fields and the harvests. The white color symbolizes the peace, friendship, work, prosperity, pureness, faith. The yellow color represents the industries of the city, generators of wealth

Coat of arms

The coat or arms was created in 1964 in Paris by heraldist Robert Louis on commission of Albert Mahler, an early German-ascent local, and later changed. It refers to Fraiburgo's woods and timber industry (logs and flowers) and St. Catherine's martyrdom tools, for the State's namesake, and includes also storks as supporters standing for Alsatia, whence come the first settlers; cogwheel and apples symbolize Fraiburgo's recent industries.

Neighbour cities  
 Lebon Régis
 Curitibanos
 Frei Rogério
 Monte Carlo
 Tangará
 Videira
 Rio das Antas
 Caçador

References

External links
Web site official
Pictures of the city

Municipalities in Santa Catarina (state)
Populated places established in 1961